James Farrer may refer to:

 James Farrer (British politician) (1812–1879), Conservative Member of Parliament
 James Farrer (Australian politician) (1876–1967)
 James Anson Farrer (1849–1925), English barrister and writer

See also
James Farrar (disambiguation)